201 (two hundred [and] one) is the natural number following 200 and preceding 202.

In mathematics

As the two proper factors of 201 are both Gaussian primes, 201 is a Blum integer.

In computing
 201 is an HTTP status code indicating a new resource was successfully created in response to the request, with the textual part of the response line indicating the URL of the newly created document.

In astronomy
 201 is a Saros cycle; the next solar eclipse in this cycle is predicted to take place in AD 3223..
 The New General Catalogue object NGC201 is a magnitude 15 spiral galaxy in the constellation Cetus.
 201 Penelope is a large Main belt asteroid discovered in 1879.

In other fields
 A 201 file is the term used in the U.S. Army for the set of documents maintained by the US government for members of the Armed Forces recording their service history. It is also referred to as the Official Military Personnel File.
 201 in binary (11001001) is the title of an episode of Star Trek: The Next Generation.
 Area code 201 is the area code assigned to northern New Jersey in the United States.
 201 is the course number of basic or entry-level courses at some Canadian universities (such as the University of Calgary and Athabasca University), especially if the number 101 is allocated to remedial courses.
 201 is also short for 201 Poplar, the jail in Memphis, Tennessee, and alluded to in many rap songs from Memphis artists.
 in Philippine employment, a 201 file is a file detailing an employee's history and records with a particular employer
The 201 Class diesel locomotive used by Iarnród Éireann and NI Railways.
 The 201 series is a Japanese commuter train type
 The EMI 201 television camera use in the 1960s
 "201" is the title of an episode of South Park.
 Event 201, a pandemic exercise

Integers